The SS Yankee Blade was a three-masted side-wheel steamship belonging to the Independent Line (a holding of Cornelius Vanderbilt). The Yankee Blade was one of the first steamships built to transport gold, passengers, and cargo between Panama and San Francisco, California, during the California Gold Rush. The ship wrecked in fog off of Point Arguello in Southern California on October 1, 1854.  The shipwreck cost an estimated 30 to 40 lives.

Transit routes during the California Gold Rush 

As soon as the discovery of gold at Sutter's Mill became known in 1848, many people wished to travel to California to mine for gold.  At that time, there were three main routes for people from the eastern United States to travel to California. The first route was via overland travel, which was expensive, dangerous, and took a long time.  Another route involved sailing approximately fourteen thousand miles around Cape Horn in South America. Though this way was faster and sometimes less expensive, the route was no less dangerous, as the weather in the south was often harsh and unforgiving. In addition to the dangers present on both routes, the journey by land could very often take over six months, and the sea route, though faster, could still take over three months to complete.

The third and fastest route involved sailing via steamship to Panama, hiking through the jungle on the Isthmus, and then sailing again from the coast of Panama to San Francisco.  Though this route cut the time of the sea journey down to less than six weeks, the lack of ships between Panama and San Francisco could often lead to significant waiting times for passengers in Panama. It was to fill this untapped market of transportation between Panama and California that the Yankee Blade was built.

Construction and design 

The SS Yankee Blade was built by Perrine, Patterson & Stack in 1853 and launched on November 11, 1853. Her engine was constructed by Allaire Iron Works. She was one of the first steamships built to carry gold, passengers, and cargo on the second leg of the journey between San Francisco and New York, via the Isthmus of Panama.  The Yankee Blade was built as one of the most luxurious ships in the Independent Line fleet, with larger, square portholes, bathrooms, and a ship's surgeon whose services were free for the passengers. The ship was built as one of the fastest at the time, her side-lever engine, a more powerful but less efficient design over the less compact walking beam type engines, propelled the ship to a cruising speed of around thirteen knots.

The Yankee Blade was commanded by Captain Henry Randall, who had worked for a competitor of the Independent Line, the Pacific Mail Steamship Company, until his retirement two years before in 1852. Captain Randall was in command of the Yankee Blade for its entire life up until the sinking.

Last voyage 

The Yankee Blade left San Francisco for Panama on what would be her final voyage on September 30, 1854. The ship held an estimated $153,000 worth of gold, as well as additional valuables passengers had entrusted to the ships purser. The official ship's manifest stated that there were 819 passengers, although due to tickets purchased last minute and the presence of stowaways, the true number of people on-board was much higher, with estimates of up to 1,200 people.

Also leaving San Francisco for Panama was the steamship Sonora, with whom it is probable the captain of the Yankee Blade was engaged in an unofficial race. On the previous day, the Daily Alta California had an advertisement alleging a $5,000 bet that the Yankee Blade would beat the Sonora to Panama. Once both ships had left the confines of the San Francisco Bay, the Sonora headed out to sea to take the longer but safer route well offshore, away from any dangerous navigational hazards. Meanwhile, the Yankee Blade set off on a route which hugged the California coast, a route that was far more dangerous due to the high risk of striking various hazards along the coast.

Shipwreck 

As the Yankee Blade steamed down the coast, it passed the coastal steamer Southerner headed for San Francisco. Concerned with the apparently reckless course taken by the Yankee Blade, the Captain of the Southerner hailed Captain Haley of the steamship Goliah, requesting that the Goliah watch for the Yankee Blade in case of the Yankee Blade running aground and requiring assistance. Although the Goliah began following the path of the Yankee Blade, the ship soon encountered thick fog banks and reduced speed for safety.

The Yankee Blade also soon encountered thick fog, but unlike Captain Haley, Captain Randall did not order a change in speed or course. Shortly after 3PM on Sunday, the Yankee Blade struck a rock pinnacle approximately one mile offshore. The resulting collision tore a twelve-foot gash in the ship's hull beneath the waterline near the stern. Firmly wedged on the rock, the forward part of the ship was driven almost sixty feet from the water by the force of the crash. However, the stern of the ship was underwater and under constant pounding from the surf, causing a fear among the officers that the ship could break in two.

Soon the ship's lifeboats were lowered with the task of ferrying the passengers to shore. In a move that was later found to be very controversial, Captain Randall himself took command of one of the lifeboats, leaving his unqualified teenage son in charge of the ship. Though Captain Randall would later claim to have been seeking a safe landing for the passengers, conflicting claims confuse whether Captain Randall returned to the wreck. It is known that he spent the night on shore while most passengers were still on board the wreck.

Rescue 

The next day, the Goliah was still slowly progressing along the coast when the ship came upon the forward remains of the Yankee Blade, still filled with the great majority of the ship's passengers. At great danger to his own ship, Captain Haley positioned the Goliah as close as possible to the remains of the Yankee Blade.  A line was set up between the two ships, and a lifeboat from the Goliah was soon ferrying the survivors from the wreck, a process which took the majority of the day. Soon after the last survivor was removed, the remains of the bow of the Yankee Blade slipped from the rock and sank. Due to the lack of space on board, the Goliah was forced to leave around three hundred survivors ashore, where they joined the others. The Goliah then dropped off its passengers in Santa Barbara, San Pedro, and San Diego before returning (though two days later due to grounding on a sandbar off of San Diego) to retrieve the survivors and return them to San Francisco.

References 

Shipwrecks of the California coast
California Gold Rush
Paddle steamers of the United States
Shipwrecks on the National Register of Historic Places in California
National Register of Historic Places in Santa Barbara County, California
Maritime incidents in October 1854